Route 402, also known as Gallants Road, is a minor highway in the Canadian province of Newfoundland and Labrador. Although no directional signage on Route 1 before the intersection in either direction depict Route 402, but according to some provincial government road maps (as early as the 1980s), Route 402 is the official name of the highway.

Major intersections

References

402